Zatorski (feminine Zatorska) is a Polish surname. Notable people with the surname include:

 Izabela Zatorska (born 1962), Polish long-distance runner
 Paweł Zatorski (born 1990), Polish volleyball player

See also
 Zagórski

Polish-language surnames